The 2022–23 ISU Challenger Series is held from September to December 2022. It is the ninth season that the ISU Challenger Series, a group of senior-level international figure skating competitions ranked below the ISU Grand Prix, is held.

Events 
The 2022–23 Challenger Series was composed of ten events.

Requirements 
Skaters were eligible to compete on the Challenger Series if they had reached the age of 15 before July 1, 2022.

Medal summary

Medalists

Men

Women

Pairs

Ice dance

Medal standings

Challenger Series rankings 
The ISU Challenger Series rankings were formed by combining the two highest final scores of each skater/team.

Men 
.

Women 
.

Pairs 
.

Ice dance 
.

Top scores

Men

Best total score

Best short program score

Best free skating score

Ladies

Best total score

Best short program score

Best free skating score

Pairs

Best total score

Best short program score

Best free skating score

Ice dance

Best total score

Best rhythm dance score

Best free dance score

Notes

References

External links 
 ISU Challenger Series at the International Skating Union

ISU Challenger Series
Figure skating competitions
Challenger Series